The W.W. Cockram Stakes is a Melbourne Racing Club Group 3 Thoroughbred horse race for mares four years old and older, run at set weights with penalties, over a distance of 1200 metres at Caulfield Racecourse, Melbourne, Australia. Prizemoney is A$200,000.

History

Name

The race is named in honour of prominent Victorian breeder W.W. (Wally) Cockram, who served as Vice Chairman of the Victorian Amateur Turf Club and Melbourne Racing Club from 1970 to 1984.

Venue
1992–1993 - held at Sandown Park Racecourse
 1994 - Caulfield Racecourse 
1995–1996 - held at Sandown Park Racecourse
 1997 - Caulfield Racecourse 
1998–2001 - held at Sandown Park Racecourse
2002 onwards - Caulfield Racecourse

Name
 2002 - Sir Edward Dunlop Research Foundation Stakes
 2014 - Sportingbet Sprint Series Heat 1 Stakes
 2015 - William Hill Sprint Series Heat 1 Stakes

Winners

 2022 - Chain Of Lightning
 2021 - Probabeel
 2020 - Perfect Jewel
 2019 - Pippie
 2018 - Ellicazoom
 2017 - Savanna Amour
 2016 - Ocean Embers
 2015 - Madam Gangster
 2014 - Gregers
 2013 - Octavia
 2012 - Lady Melksham
 2011 - Mid Summer Music
 2010 - Rhythm In Paris
 2009 - Cats Whisker
 2008 - Princess Gisella
 2007 - Storm Signal
 2006 - Storm Alert
 2005 - Dea
 2004 - Strikeline
 2003 - Brief Embrace
 2002 - Pernod
 2001 - Libidinious
 2000 - Tickle My
 1999 - Chillies
 1998 - Spectrum
 1997 - Tonicity
 1996 - Street Talk
 1995 - Petite Amour
 1994 - Timeless Grace 
 1993 - Party Dancer
 1992 - Pride Of Demus

See also
 List of Australian Group races
 Group races

References

Horse races in Australia